A League of Their Own is an Australian comedy panel game, which first aired on Network Ten on 16 September 2013. It is hosted by Tommy Little and features Pat Cash and Eamon Sullivan as team captains. The show was cancelled to immediate effect after posting a disappointing rating in the show's ninth week. The tenth episode, which never aired, is available online for viewing.

Format
The show is based on the British game show of the same name. The show is a standard panel quiz show where two teams of three, compete for points awarded in three rounds, in order to find the overall winning team by points total.

 Round 1 involves both teams either having to rank three different sports persons according to a specific criterion, or match sports persons to specific criteria.
 Round 2, Battle of the Codes, involves a member from each an AFL and an NRL team go head-to-head, where as the teams must choose which party they lend their support. 
 Round 3, Human Clock, sees one or two members of each team have to answer questions for as long as the other team members can sustain a physical challenge in the studio.
Often within the first round, teams have to complete short physical tasks, which are usually linked to either one of the guests on the teams or to the question they have to answer.

Episodes
The coloured backgrounds denote the result of each of the shows:
 – Eamon's team won
 – Pat's team won

Notes:

Ratings

References

External links
 

2010s Australian comedy television series
2010s Australian game shows
2013 Australian television series debuts
2013 Australian television series endings
Australian panel games
Australian sports television series
Australian television series based on British television series
Network 10 original programming
Television series by Freehand Productions